Rakim Jarrett (born January 24, 2001) is an American football wide receiver for the Maryland Terrapins.

High school career
Jarrett attended St. John's College High School in Washington, D.C. He was the Gatorade Football Player of the Year for Washington, D.C. his senior year in 2019 after recording 60 receptions for 950 yards and seven touchdowns.

A five-star recruit, Jarrett originally committed to Louisiana State University (LSU) to play college football before switching to the University of Maryland, College Park.

College career
As a true freshman at Maryland in 2020, Jarrett started all four games he played in and had 17 receptions for 252 yards and two touchdowns. As a sophomore in 2021, he started all 13 games and recorded 62 receptions for 829 yards and five touchdowns.

References

External links
Maryland Terrapins bio

Living people
People from Palmer Park, Maryland
Players of American football from Maryland
American football wide receivers
Maryland Terrapins football players
2001 births